Matthew Nashid Lawrence (born May 5, 1985) is a former American football running back. He was signed by the Chicago Bears as an undrafted free agent in 2007. He has also been a member of the Seattle Seahawks. He played college football at Massachusetts after transferring from the Connecticut Huskies.

NFL career

Going undrafted into the NFL in 2008, Lawrence was first signed by the Chicago Bears and Seattle Seahawks and then by the Baltimore Ravens.

External links
Baltimore Ravens bio
Chicago Bears Bio
UMass Minutemen bio

1985 births
Living people
Players of American football from Hartford, Connecticut
American football fullbacks
UConn Huskies football players
UMass Minutemen football players
Chicago Bears players
Seattle Seahawks players
Baltimore Ravens players
Bloomfield High School (Connecticut) alumni